Clemenceau  was the French Navy's sixth aircraft carrier and the lead ship of her class. The carrier served from 1961 to 1997, and was dismantled and recycled in 2009. The carrier was the second French warship to be named after Georges Clemenceau, the first being a  laid down in 1939 but never finished.

Clemenceau and her sister ship  served as the mainstays of the French fleet. During the carrier's career, Clemenceau sailed more than  during 3,125 days at sea. She was equipped to handle nuclear munitions to be delivered by her air complement, and was later modified to fire nuclear-capable missiles. She took part in numerous exercises and cruises, seeing action during the Lebanese Civil War, Gulf War and in air operations over the former Yugoslavia.

Description
The development of Clemenceau represented France's effort to produce its own class of multi-role aircraft carriers to replace the American and British ships provided at the end of World War II. The ship had a small but effective design, using some of the elements of United States carriers, but on a smaller scale. The vessels were given relatively heavy gun armament for their size, and some stability problems were encountered which required bulging the hull.

The Clemenceau-class aircraft carriers are of conventional CATOBAR design. The forward aircraft elevator was to starboard, and the rear elevator was positioned on the deck edge to save hangar space. The forward of two  catapults was at the bow to port, the aft catapult was on the angled landing deck.

Clemenceau went through a major refit from September 1977 to November 1978. She was refitted again with new defensive systems from 1September 1985 to 31August 1987, this included the replacement of four of the 100 mm guns with a pair of Crotale surface-to-air missile launchers. She was modified in 1978 to enable her aircraft to deliver several AN 52 bombs. In 1993 she was modified again to take nuclear capable Air-Sol Moyenne Portée missiles.

History

Career
Throughout the course of the aircraft carrier's lengthy career, it participated in the majority of French naval operations. From 12January to 5February 1962, Clemenceau participated in a NATO exercise known as BigGame with the United States Sixth Fleet in the western Mediterranean as an anti-submarine aircraft carrier. This was followed from 9March to 2April with another NATO exercise called OTAN Dawn Breeze VII, in the Gibraltar zone.

In January 1968, Clemenceau participated in the search for the lost submarine  in the Mediterranean when contact was lost  from port at Toulon. Minerve remained lost until French Defence Minister Florence Parly announced on 22 July 2019 that the wreck had been discovered.

During the same year, the carrier was deployed to the south Pacific for French nuclear bomb testing in Polynesia including Canopus, the first French hydrogen bomb. With the deployment of the fleet, codenamed Alfa Force, the naval force present around two atolls represented more than 40% of the tonnage of the entire French navy. Clemenceau was the flagship of a fleet composed of forty ships.

During 1974–1977 Clemenceau was deployed off the African coast in the Indian Ocean in Operation Saphir I and Operation Saphir II in support of newly independent Djibouti. During the Lebanese Civil War Clemenceau was deployed in the East Mediterranean in 1983–84. The carrier's main support engagement was in Operation Olifant. In 1987–1988 she participated in Operation Prométhée in the Gulf of Oman during the war between Iraq and Iran. The Promethée battle force (Task Force 623), included Clemenceau, the mine counter-measures support ship Loire, and s Meuse, Var, and Marne. In 1990, escorted by the cruiser  and the tanker Var, she transported 40 helicopters (SA-341F/ -342 Gazelles, SA-330 Pumas), three Br-1050 Alizés and trucks to Iraq during Operations Desert Shield and Desert Storm. The carrier was mainly engaged in Operation Salamandre in the Red Sea and the Arabian Sea during the conflict between Iraq and Kuwait. During 1993 to 1996 Clemenceau completed several tours including combat operations and air patrol over the former Yugoslavia in Operation Balbuzard in order to support the UN's troops, then Salamandre in the Adriatic Sea during the Yugoslav Wars.

Clemenceau operated around the world with a career total of more than one million nautical miles traveled, the equivalent of circumnavigating the globe 48 times. The carrier has passed 3,125 days at sea, with 80,000 hours of function, and conducted more than 70,000 catapult-launches.

In 1983, the bâtiment was the first unit of the French Navy to embark female personnel. Three women were assigned on board: one maître principal, one secrétaire militaire and one premier maître.

Loyal to the tradition of the French Navy, Clemenceau welcomed on board numerous fine art painters, some for a week and others for up to two months.

Disposal

On 31 December 2005, Clemenceau left Toulon to be dismantled in Alang, India despite protests about improper disposal and a lack of facilities for the management of toxic waste. 

On 6January 2006, the Supreme Court of India temporarily denied access to Alang. After having been boarded by activists, held by Egyptian authorities, and then transiting the Suez Canal on 15January, a court ruling by the Conseil d'État ordered Clemenceau to return to French waters. Able UK, based at the Graythorp yard near Hartlepool received a disassembly contract to use accepted practices in scrapping the ship. The dismantling started on 18November 2009 and the break-up was completed by the end of2010.

General arrangement

In popular culture
 A 1985 television commercial for the Citroën Visa GTI car was shot aboard Clemenceau. A race pits the car against a Dassault Étendard IV; both continue off the end of the carrier, with the small automobile briefly keeping pace with the aircraft before plummeting into the ocean. Seconds later, though, the car triumphantly emerges, perched on the foredeck of a surfacing Agosta-class submarine.

Gallery

References

Bibliography

Further reading
 
</ref>

External links

  Aircraft Carrier Clemenceau on Alabordache
 Deadly Vessel : Feature on the Vessel in the Indian newsmagazine Frontline
 Victory: Toxic warship Clemenceau turned back to France! : Greenpeace View of the controversy

Clemenceau-class aircraft carriers
Ships built in France
1957 ships
Cold War aircraft carriers of France
Gulf War ships of France